Marianne Loir or Marie-Anne Loir (c. 1715 – 1769) was a French painter who specialized in portraits.

Biography 

Marianne Loir was born in Paris around 1715, daughter of the goldsmith Alexis II Loir and granddaughter of Nicolas Loir. Her brother, Alexis III Loir (1712–1785), was a renowned sculptor.

She studied under Jean François de Troy (1679–1752), director of the French Academy in Rome, where Marianne stayed between 1738 and 1746.
She became a member of the Académie des Beaux-Arts in Marseille in 1762, and seems to have stayed at Pau for a time in the 1720s and Toulouse.
In 1763 she was in Paris, where she completed a portrait of the young Antoine Duplas on 1 September. She left Paris in 1765 and moved to Provence. She died sometime in 1769.

She left ten paintings, signed and dated between 1745 and 1769.

Works 

Works include:

Drawings, watercolors
   N – D   – Portrait de jeune femme Dessin, aquarelle, pastel (attribué); Dim; H:54,5 cm X L:44 cm (Vente France, 24 juin 1998)Paintings 1737  –  Portrait du Duc de Bourbon  HST; S; Dim; H: X L: (notes dans Christine Kaiser; effigie payée entre 1737 et 1738)
 1740  c  Portrait de Gabrielle Emilie Le Tonnelier de Breteuil, Marquise du Châtelet décédée en 1749 HST; Dim; H:118 cm X L:96 cm (Musée des beaux-arts de Bordeaux, attribution en 1803 provient des collections royales française, n°inv: Bx E19 Bx M5848 restauré en 1969 et 1971
 1740  –  Portrait miniature de Emilie du Châtelet  collection of Jane Birkenstock, San Jose, California, USA
 1740  c  Portrait de Marie Charles Auguste Grimaldi (1722–1749), Comte de Matignon, frère du Prince de Monaco (Attributed) HST; Dim; H: X L: (Musée de Saint-Lô dans la Manche)
 1749  – Portrait de Maurice de Saxe HST; Dim; H: 137 cm X L:105 cm (Collection Jacques d'Alençon, inscription on the back of the painting. Collection Baronne Bosmelet née du Trésor, vente anonyme à Galerie Charpentier 6 déc. 1952 (Me Ader) no B Acquis par Mr Huck-Astier dans la famille depuis, vente Robert à Paris le 28 nov. 2008 lot n°16, Robert & Baille, 28 nov. 2008)
 1750  c Portrait d'un gentilhomme écrivant " HST; (attribué); Dim; H:112cm X L: 86,7cm (Bowes Museum n°accession BM354, Royaume-Uni)
 1750  c Portrait d'homme HST; Dim; H:80cm X L:64cm (Musée des Beaux-Arts d'Orléans, n°inv: INV976, base Joconde)
 1760  c Portrait présumé de Madame Geoffrin HST; H: X L: (National Museum of Women in the Arts à Washington DC USA, don de Wallace et Wilhelmina Holladay)
 1760  c Portrait du Chevalier de Fleury Commandeur de l'Ordre de Malte, commandant de la place de Montlouis à Castries, HST; S; Dim; H:78,5cm X L:63,1cm (classé MH le 5 déc. 2000 au  château de Castries)
 1761  – Portrait d'homme au livre HST; SD au revers de la toile Âgé de 54 ans et peint par Melle Loir en Avril 1761; Dim; H:90,5cm X L:73cm (vente Pescheteau Badin)
 1763  – Portrait de Antoine Vincent Louis Barbe Duplas âgé de 9 ans peint le 1er sept. 1763, HST; SD; Dim; 75cm X L: 59cm (Musée des Beaux-Arts de Tours n°inv: 52.1.8.)
 1763  – Portrait présumé de Marion de Mersan « HST; Dim; H: X L: (connu par base Joconde fiche du Portrait d'homme)
   N – D   – L'Enfant au râteau HST; S; Dim; H:75 cm X L:59 cm (Musée des Beaux-Arts de Tours)
   N – D   – Portrait de J. N. Regnault HST; S; Dim; H: X L: (connu d'après la gravure de François Robert Ingouf, estampe des grands albums de gravures de Philippe d'Orléans conservés au Musée de Versailles)
   N – D   – Portrait d'une femme tenant une partition de musique (attribué) HST; Dim; H:80,5 cm X L:64,5 cm (lot n°18 vente France, 28 juin 2007)
   N – D   – Portrait présumé de Madame de Séran HST; Dim; H:80 cm X L:64 cm (vente France, lot n°30, Daguerre)
   N – D   – Portrait d'un gentilhomme » HST; Dim; H: X L: (vente à Galliera le 3 déc. 1969, n° 68, connu par la fiche du Portrait d'homme de la base Joconde)
   N – D   – Portrait de la Comtesse de la Ferrière HST; Dim; H:101cm X L:81cm (Pillet, 5 avril 2009, lot n°50)
   N – D   – Bildnis des Gabriel Nicolas Silvain de Montaignac d'Estan – san im alter von zehn jahren HST; S; Dim; H:72,5cm X L: 60cm (Dorotheum, 23 juin 1992)
   N – D   – Portrait d'homme assis à son bureau  HST; (attribué) Dim; H:81cm X L:65cm (vente Tajan Drouot 12 déc. 2005)
   N – D   – Portrait présumé de Monsieur de la Blotterie HST; S; Dim; H:100 cm X L:80cm (exposé par la galerie Frédérick Chanoit à Paris)
   N – D   – Portrait d'un homme en robe de bure HST; Dim; H:117cm X L:89cm, (Tajan, 21 juin 2005, lot n°64)
   N – D   – Portrait d'un violiste HST; Dim; H: X L: (réplique de l'œuvre de Louis Tocqué Florence Gétreau IRPMF)
   N – D   – Portrait d'une femme assise en robe rouge HST; Dim; H:81,3cm X L:66cm (New-York Rockefeller Plaza, vente 2175 le 4 juin 2009)
   N – D   – Portrait d'une fillette tenant une guirlande de fleurs " HST; Dim; H: X L: (Tajan 18 mars 2005, Drouot)

 Titles, distinctions 
 1762 – Member of the Académie des Beaux-Arts de Marseille

 Museums holding her work 

 Musée des Beaux-Arts de Tours, Indre-et-Loire: (  Portrait d'Antoine Duplas) – ( L'Enfant au râteau )
 Bowes Museum, United Kingdom: (  Portrait d'un gentilhomme écrivant )
 National Museum of Women in the Arts, Washington DC, USA: (  Portrait présumé de Madame Geoffrin)
 Musée des Beaux-Arts d'Orléans, Loiret: ( Portrait d'homme  )
 Château de Castries, Hérault: ( Portrait du Chevalier de Fleury)
 Musée des Beaux-Arts de Bordeaux, Gironde: (Portrait de Gabrielle Emilie  Le Tonnelier de Breteuil, Marquise du Châtelet)
 Collection de Jane Birkenstock, San Jose CA USA: ( Miniature de Emilie du Châtelet )
 Musée des Beaux-Arts de Saint-Lô, Manche: ( Portrait de Marie Charles Auguste Grimaldi)
 Portland Art Museum, Portland, Oregon, USA: ( Portrait of a Man)

ReferencesCitationsSources' 
 Larousse Grand dictionnaire universel 1982
 Xavier Salmon, Pierre Gobert et Marianne Loir, Dossier de l'Art, n°62, 2 nov. 1999, p. 56–61
 C. Constans, « Marianne Loir », Petit Larousse de la peinture'', Paris, 1979, 1, p. 1042

1710s births
1769 deaths
18th-century French painters
Painters from Paris
French women painters
18th-century French women artists